Kemmis is a rural locality in the Isaac Region, Queensland, Australia.

History 
The locality was named after pastoralist, Arthur Kemmis, who participated in William Landsborough's 1861 expedition from the Gulf of Carpentaria to Melbourne in search of the Burke and Wills expedition. Kemmis was partner in the lease of Fort Cooper pastoral run.

References 

Isaac Region
Localities in Queensland